Moraksan (sometimes referred to as Mt. Morak) is located in Gyeonggi-do, South Korea. The mountain is 385 meters above sea level. The mountain is almost entirely composed of rock. On the north side a precipitous mountain face stretches away like a wall. In its westside is Uiwang, Anyang. On Moraksan, there is a tropaion of the 1st Division, a 15th infantry regiment.

Hiking the mountain takes about 2 hours and 30 minutes.

See also
Surisan

References
www.ggtour.or.kr
http://map.naver.com/local/siteview.nhn?code=11491376&type=spot

Mountains of South Korea
Mountains of Gyeonggi Province